This is a list of episodes of the British television show Lovejoy which first aired between 1986 and 1994. The first series was broadcast in 1986, followed by a five-year hiatus before the second series in 1991.

Though there was a recurring supporting cast, the only actor to appear in all 71 episodes was Ian McShane, who played the eponymous role of Lovejoy, a likeable but roguish antiques dealer.

Series overview

Episodes

Series 1 (1986)

Series 2 (1991)

Notes: The final episode of Series 2, "The Black Virgin of Vladimir", was moved back a week because no episode was aired on Sunday, 17 March 1991, because of the British Academy Awards.

In repeats, "The Black Virgin of Vladimir" is sometimes cut into two parts, with the first part entitled "Riding in Rollers".

Series 3 (1992)

Series 4 (1993)

Series 5 (1993)

Series 6 (1994)

References
BBC website Lovejoy episode guide

Lists of British crime television series episodes
Lists of British comedy-drama television series episodes